The Zohrabbayovs' house is a 19th century building that belonged to the representative of the noble Shusha family of the Zohrabbayovs, to Abbasgulu bey Zohrabbayov.

History 
The owner of the house, Abbasgulu bey Zohrabbayov (born in 1868 in Shusha), was a merchant of the second guild in the Russian Empire. The construction of the house began by his father,  Mirza Akbar bey Zohrabbayov. After this death, Abbasgulu bey completed the construction. The huge and wide glazed veranda (Shushebend) of the house was completely decorated with antique drawings. On each floor, there was a hall with a capacity of 200 - 250 people, a veranda, a bedroom, a nursery, a steam kitchen, a toilet, and sewerage lines. Masters from Iran and Turkey were involved in the construction, the architect was Karbalayi Safikhan Karabakhi, a native from Karabakh.

After the Soviet occupation, Abbasgulu bey's house was confiscated, so he and his family moved to Baku. The house was subsequently converted into an art gallery.

After the capture of the city of Shusha by the Armenian armed forces on 8 May 1992, the building was plundered, the valuable decoration of the house, stained glass mirrors (shabaka), and the wall paintings disappeared. Due to the 28 years of occupation, the building was in disrepair, it was destroyed.

Gallery

See also 
 House of Khurshidbanu Natavan

References

Monuments and memorials in Shusha
Palaces in Azerbaijan